Lier is a municipality located in the Belgian province of Antwerp. It is composed of the city of Lier proper and the village of Koningshooikt. The city centre is surrounded by the river Nete, around which it grew. In 2018, Lier had a total population of 35,712. The total area is 49.70 km making a population density (PD) of 720 per km. Lier is known for its beers (which include Caves), its patron saint St. Gummarus and Lierse vlaaikes cake. It is also home to the world headquarters of Van Hool, a global bus and coach manufacturer. Lier's two principal football clubs are K. Lyra-Lierse and Lierse Kempenzonen (formerly known as KFC Oosterzonen, which moved to Lier in 2018).

Etymology
The etymology of the name Lier is still under debate. It most likely refers to the river Nete and the muddy soils that surrounds it. The Latin name of Lier is Lyra, the suffix of which (-ara) is probably derived from the Germanic or Celtic  reference to river. Alternatively, the origin might be the Germanic words Ledo or Ledi, which both refer to a location near the confluence of rivers (in this case the Minor and Major Nete). Other explanations include the old Dutch word laar (clearance in the woods) or the word liere (parapet). There is also a resemblance to the Swedish word leira, which means muddy shore, or the Icelandic word leir, which means clay. An all together different explanation is the Germanic word hieura, which refers to a hillock type of country.

History

There is scant record of Lier predating the 7th century. Saint Gummarus himself was born in the 7th century and died on 11 October 714. He was canonised in 754. In 1194 Lier was given oppidum status and in 1212 granted municipal rights. The Lier beguinage was founded in 1258 and in 1998 was inscribed on the UNESCO World Heritage List as part of the Flemish Béguinages site. The last surviving beguine died in 1994.

In the 14th century, Duke Jan II wished to reward the City of Lier for joining his fight against the City of Mechelen. He offered the city the choice of either hosting a university or a livestock market. The city notoriously selected the livestock market option, upon which the Duke is reported to have sighed: "Oh, those wretched sheep heads". Today, a herd of bronze sheep near the Zimmer tower serves as a reminder to this fateful decision. The university was eventually seeded in the city of Leuven, in 1425, as one of Europe's first and today most prominent universities. The nickname Schapekoppen (which translates to Sheep Heads) is still used in Flanders to refer to inhabitants of Lier.

In 1496, Lier was the scene of the marriage between Philip the Handsome, son of Maximilian of Austria, and Joanna of Castile. This marriage was pivotal to the history of Europe, for Charles V, who was born to this marriage (Ghent, 1500), would go on to rule both the Holy Roman Empire and the Spanish Empire.

King Christian II of Denmark, accompanied by his spouse Isabella (sister to Charles V and known as Queen Elisabeth), lived in Lier until 1523, after having been expelled from Denmark by the local nobility while waiting in vain for military support from his brother in law. He attempted again to regain the Danish and Norwegian throne, but was taken prisoner and spent the rest of his life detained in the Danish castles of Sønderborg and Kalundborg. Isabella died in 1526 at the Castle of Zwijnaarde.

A conspicuous feature of the market square is a headstone (witches-stone, placed in 1974) that marks the spot where Lier's last witchcraft-related execution is traditionally believed to have taken place.

In 1860, a skeleton of a mammoth was unearthed at the site of the current city hall buildings. It was the first mammoth skeleton to be discovered in western Europe.

At the start of the WWI, King Albert and his Chiefs of Staff were temporarily headquartered in Lier, before retreating to Temse as German lines advanced. Being part of the redoubt of Antwerp, the city suffered heavily under German artillery fire, leaving much of its medieval structures damaged beyond repair. Most medieval-style structures that exist today (including the town hall and its belfry) are therefore replicas, built shortly after the War.

Lier is routinely referred to with the rhyme Lierke Plezierke (which roughly translates as "fun in Lier"). This expression originates from a booklet Felix Timmermans wrote in 1928, in celebration of the 50th wedding anniversary of a neighbouring couple.

The strong ties Lier had developed with the Belgian military ever since in 1888 artillery barracks were built, continued after the World Wars. From 1955 to 1997 the barracks housed the Royal School of Cadets (cadet school for the Belgian army). A prominent alumnus of this school is Belgian astronaut Frank De Winne. The site was vacated by the army in 1998, acquired by the city, and now houses city hall and the police department. Two artillery pieces are on display on the city hall's patio, as a reminder of the building's past. The city of Lier is also patron city to the Belgian Army's Second Artillery Regiment (now termed the Artillery Battalion).

Geography 

Lier is divided into five main districts: Leuvensepoort, Mechelpoort, Lisp, the city centre and Koningshooikt. The last is a historic village that was administratively joined to the town as a sub-municipality in 1977.

Demographics

Local government

Former mayors

Notable people
 Anton Bergmann, lawyer and writer
 Cornelis de Bie, lawyer and writer
 Jan Ceulemans, football player
 Jean-Baptist David, canon and founder of the Davidsfonds
 Patrick Dewael, politician, former Minister-President of Flanders
 Pieter Dox, Missionary killed during the Simba rebellion
 Wim Henderickx (b. Lier, 1962), composer
 Isidoor Opsomer, painter
 Bob Peeters, former football player, now a manager
 Felix Timmermans, Flemish writer and painter
 Triggerfinger, rock band
 Lodewijck Van Boeckel, ornamental smith
 Herman Van Breda, founder of the Husserl archive
 Wim Vandekeybus (b. Lier, 1963) choreographer, director, film maker
 Herman Vanderpoorten, politician (1922–1984)
 Yanina Wickmayer, tennis player
 Marc Zabeau (b. Lier, 1949), scientist and businessman

Points of interest

 The Beguinage (UNESCO World Heritage Site) and St Margarita church, 17th century.
 The St. Gummarus Church, gothic architecture, 14th century; under high altar is grave of Olav Engelbrektsson, last Roman Catholic Archbishop of Nidaros.
 The Timmermans - Opsomerhuis museum.
 The Stedelijk Museum Wuyts-Van Campen en Baron Caroly, a fine arts museum.
 The Town hall, rococo architecture, 18th century.
 The adjoining 14th century belfry, listed in the UNESCO World Heritage Site Belfries of Belgium and France.
 The Zimmer Tower houses a unique astronomical clock built in the 1930s, by Louis Zimmer.

In popular culture
In 2004, Lier was the host for the third episode of Fata Morgana, the TV show in which Belgian celebrities gave a city or town several challenges. The theme was "Lier 2020" and the inhabitants succeeded in completing all challenges.

Gallery

See also
 Lier mammoth

References

External links
  (Flemish only)

 
Municipalities of Antwerp Province
Populated places in Antwerp Province